Teen Lust can refer to:

 Teen Lust (1979 film), a 1979 film
 Teen Lust (2014 film), a 2014 Canadian film